The 2019 Cupa României Final is the final match of the 2018–19 Cupa României and the 81st final of the Cupa României, Romania's premier football cup competition. It was played on 25 May 2019 between Astra Giurgiu and Viitorul Constanța.

Astra Giurgiu reached their third cup final in the club's existence. The club from Giurgiu won the cup in 2014 and lost the final in 2017, when the match was played on the same Ilie Oană Stadium, the home ground of Astra's bitter rival, Petrolul Ploiești. It should be mentioned that Astra was a football club originally from Ploiești until it was relocated in 2012 to Giurgiu.

On the other hand, this was the first Romanian Cup final for Viitorul. The champions of Romania in 2017, Hagi's Kids were in front of the second big achievement in the 10 years history of the club located on the seaside of the Black Sea.

The winner qualified for the 2019–20 UEFA Europa League. They also earned the right to play against 2018–19 Liga I champions for the 2019 Supercupa României.

Viitorul Constanța won the game dramatically by scoring in the extra-time.

The game was hosted by the Ilie Oană Stadium in Ploiești.

Route to the Final

Match

References

External links
 Official site 

2019
2018–19 in Romanian football
2018–19 Cupa României
FC Astra Giurgiu matches
FC Viitorul Constanța matches
May 2019 sports events in Europe